A cuckoo's nest is the nest of a cuckoo.

Cuckoo's nest may also refer to:

Entertainment

Music
 A song by John Hartford from the 1977 album All in the Name of Love
 A song by Norman Blake from the 1975 album Old and New
 A song by Spiers and Boden from the 2005 album Tunes
 A song by Nickel Creek from the eponymous 2000 album

Television
 "Cuckoo's Nest" (CSI: NY), an episode of CSI: NY
 The Korean name of the South Korean television series Two Mothers (뻐꾸기 둥지)

Other uses
 Cuckoo's Nest (nightclub), Costa Mesa, California, U.S.
 Cuckoos Nest railway station, West Yorkshire, Northern England
 Cuckoo's Nest Studio, an animation studio in Taiwan

See also 
 One Flew Over the Cuckoo's Nest (disambiguation)
 Cuckoo's egg (disambiguation)